The children of Niobe is a novel written by Tasos Athanasiadis. In this novel Athanasiadis describes the way Greeks lived in Anatolia by the example of the small community of Salihli. Probably the title is inspired by the myth of Niobe. In 2004 the novel was serialized on Greek television.

Plot summary
So we are in Salihli and watching life before the advent of the Greek Army. Central role played by the family of Michael Anastasiadis or Sarris, a middle-aged notable and a banker of Salihli with a charming, clever and cheated 35-years-old wife and four children (3 girls and 1 boy), madly in love with the 16-years-old Tarsi, a beautiful gazelle who refuses to marry the son of wealthy Turkish businessman, for whom she worked, and enchants everybody with her provocative teen flesh. In the meantime, we are watching the raids of the Turkish gendarmerie and terror they caused to the Greeks, the close relationship of Turks and Greeks as long as the one was not feeling threat from the other, hidden hopes for better days, the every day misdeeds caused by the human weakness and often leading to unexpected misery, mainly focusing on the guiltiness and the passion of Sarris for the 16 years old Tarsi.

Then the novel described the pleasant (initially) life during the Greek occupation and the contact of the Minor Asian Greeks with the Greek soldiers who occupied Salihli to get up to the Destruction of Smyrna. After Sarris dies, his family loses slightly its primary place in the story. The beautiful and poor Tarsi rises socially but remains an erotic symbol of the lustful East. In the presence of the Greek army, dreams of the Greeks for freedom seem to come true. But follows the error handling and the underground system of espionage and undermining that Turks had set in the west Minor Asia, leading to the collapse of the front and the devastating consequences for Asia Minor. We will follow Asia Minor refugees and their efforts initially to save and then to find their feet in their new homeland.

In the twelve chapters of the first book, the life just before the Greek occupation in Anatolia is being described.

In the twelve chapters of the second book, the life up to the destruction of İzmir is described.

In the eight chapters of the third book (1st to 8th) and in the seven chapters of the fourth book (9th to 15th) of the novel, the displacement in Greece is being described.

References

Greek novels